YBM may refer to:

 YBM Seoul Records, former name of Korean company Kakao M
 ybm, ISO 639 code for the Yaben language
 YBM Sisa, Korean company that developed the Nintendo DS software Touch Dictionary
 YBM, former IATA code for Bronson Creek Airport, Canada
 Young Bretons Movement/Ar Vretoned Yaouank, the youth section of the Breton Party in France
 YBM Magnex, originally known as Alberta-incorporated company Partecs, purportedly used in a "pump and dump" scheme